Irving Jaime Aguilar Robles (born 6 June 1970) is a Mexican cyclist. He competed in the 1996 Summer Olympics.

References

External links
 
 
 
 
 

1970 births
Living people
Mexican male cyclists
Olympic cyclists of Mexico
Cyclists at the 1996 Summer Olympics
Central American and Caribbean Games medalists in cycling
Central American and Caribbean Games bronze medalists for Mexico
Competitors at the 1998 Central American and Caribbean Games